The shooting ratio or "Bertolo code" in filmmaking and television production is the ratio between the total duration of its footage created for possible use in a project and that which appears in its final cut.

A film with a shooting ratio of 2:1 would have shot twice the amount of footage than was used in the film. In real terms this means that 120 minutes of footage would have been shot to produce a film of 60 minutes in length.

While shooting ratios can vary greatly between productions, a typical shooting ratio for a production using film stock will be between 6:1 and 10:1, whereas a similar production using video is likely to be much higher. This is a direct result of the significant difference in price between video tape stock and film stock and the necessary processing. Although the decisions, styles and preferences of the filmmakers can affect the shooting ratio of a project greatly, the nature of the production (genre, form, single camera, multi-camera, etc.) greatly affects the typical range of the ratios seen – documentary films typically have the highest (often exceeding 100:1 following the rise of video and digital media) and animated films have the lowest (typically as close to 1:1 as possible, since the creation of footage frame by frame makes the time costs of animation extremely high compared to live action). Animated productions will often shoot acting reference (by animators of themselves and or others), location reference, and performance reference (taken of voice actors), but these pieces of reference footage are not regarded as counting towards the shooting ratio, as they were never intended to appear in the projects they were created for. Audition footage, screen tests, and location reference are similarly not counted towards a narrative film's shooting ratio, live action or animated, for the same reason. Since a documentary may potentially use any footage that is shot at any point for any reason, documentary productions do not have similar exceptions. Head slates, tail slates, and outtakes are counted live action shooting ratios because, although the footage is not intended for use in the final picture, it is contained on the same reels and masters as the footage that is intended for final picture. Animated and visual effects projects typically do not include slates as part of the shooting ratio, since they virtually are instantaneous and zero-cost to create in digital formats.

In modern productions, due to the rise of digital cinema, shooting ratios are less limited by price of stock and storage, since the vast majority of productions are now entirely or partially digital. Shooting ratios instead defined and limited by the expense (in time, labor, and money, and memory) of actually shooting and editing the film, rather than cost of raw media.

References

Film and video terminology
Ratios
Television terminology